Andrews Independent School District is a school district headquartered in Andrews, Texas, United States. Andrews ISD, which serves all of the city of Andrews and all of Andrews County, is served by the Educational Service Center Region 18.

Schools
The district has students in five schools, all located in Andrews. 
High schools
Andrews High School (Grades 9-12)
Middle schools
Andrews Middle School (Grades 6-8)
Elementary schools
Clearfork Elementary (Grades EE-1)
Devonian Elementary (Grades 2-3)
Underwood Elementary (Grades 4-5)

Additional features
Andrews High School has a large capacity football stadium named Mustang Bowl. In 2018 the district passed a bond resolution to finance renovations and expansion for all the schools in the district.

See also

List of school districts in Texas
List of high schools in Texas

References

External links
 Andrews ISD

School districts in Andrews County, Texas